Brsečine is a village in southern Croatia, administratively located in the City of Dubrovnik, about 1 km from the cove bearing the same name, and 25 km northwest of Dubrovnik. Population is 96 (2011). Its economy is based on farming and fishing. Brsečine is protected from cold, northerly winds by the limestone crests of Kondulo.

In the cove is the summer mansion of the Zuzorić family from the 16th century, and above the cove, the fortified mansion of the Ohmućević-Bizzaro family, with a chapel and a park, from the 17th century. The village also features the church of St. George and the ruins of a small church of St. Stephen located next to it.

References

Populated places in Dubrovnik-Neretva County